Musa Gurban oglu Gurbanli (born on 13 April 2002) is an Azerbaijani professional footballer who plays as a striker for Azerbaijan Premier League club Qarabağ and the Azerbaijan national team.

Club career
Gurbanli signed a contract with Qarabağ FK in August 2017. He made his debut for the club on 20 December 2019 in an Azerbaijan Cup match against Keşla, which Qarabağ won 3–1. He made his debut in the Azerbaijan Premier League for Qarabağ on 25 September 2020, match against Sumgayit.

On 16 December 2022, Gurbanli signed a new four-year contract with Qarabağ.

International career
On 31 May 2019, Gurbanli was called up Azerbaijan U21 by Milan Obradovic.

He made his official debut for Azerbaijan U21 on 6 June 2020, against Liechtenstein U21 in a EURO-2021 U21 Championship qualification match.

Gurbanli made his Azerbaijan debut on 11 November 2020 against Slovenia in friendly match.

Career statistics

Club

International 

Scores and results list Azerbaijan's goal tally first, score column indicates score after each Gurbanli goal.

Personal life
Gurbanli is the son of former Azerbaijani international and current Qarabağ FK manager Gurban Gurbanov and nephew of Musa Gurbanov.

Honours
Qarabağ
 Azerbaijan Premier League (2): 2019–20, 2021–22

References

External links
 
 Musa Gurbanli at www.uefa.com
 Musa Gurbanli at qarabagh.com
 

2002 births
Living people
Association football forwards
Azerbaijani footballers
Qarabağ FK players
Zira FK players
Azerbaijan Premier League players
Azerbaijan international footballers
Azerbaijan under-21 international footballers
Azerbaijan youth international footballers